HM Prison Perth is a prison that houses short term adult male prisoners (those prisoners serving under 4 years). A maximum security establishment which also houses fine defaulters and those on remand from the courts of Angus, City of Dundee, Perth and Kinross and the northern part of Fife. There is also a secure unit for Category A prisoners who are serving sentences of up to life imprisonment. It is Scotland's oldest prison still in use.

The main building, a half-mile (1 km) south of the city centre beyond the South Inch, was constructed by architect Robert Reid (1774–1856) from 1810-12 to hold French prisoners captured during the Napoleonic Wars, when it was known as the Depot. In 1842, the building began service as a civilian prison. It comprises five halls (labelled A to C) and has a capacity of 504 prisoners.

This modern building once served to prepare prisoners for open conditions and had a capacity of 89. Friarton closed in early 2010 and is no longer part of HMP Perth, this building was demolished to make way for a new housing estate.

HMP Perth no longer has a D Hall or an E hall. The old C Hall was knocked down in 2006 to make way for a new fit for purpose C Hall which holds 365 prisoners. HMP Perth now holds around 700 prisoners. Perth holds a conserdably large amount of long term prisoners who usually serve for more than 4 years.

In 1965, the United Kingdom's last condemned suite was constructed at HMP Perth. The building was separate from the rest of the prison and was known as the 'Hanging Block'. It was never used as the death penalty was suspended later that year and abolished for murder in 1969.

When the gallows at HMP Barlinnie were removed in 1995, the facility at HMP Perth was retained for use in the unlikely event of a death sentence being executed for one of the remaining capital offences. It was converted for use as an officer training facility after the final abolition of the death penalty for all offences in 1998 and demolished in 2006.

See also
List of Category A listed buildings in Perth and Kinross
List of listed buildings in Perth, Scotland

References

Listed prison buildings in Scotland
Listed buildings in Perth, Scotland
Prisons in Perth, Scotland
Category A listed buildings in Perth and Kinross
19th-century establishments in Scotland
Execution sites in Scotland
1842 establishments in Scotland